The Brisbane Lightning is a semi-professional ice hockey team based in Brisbane, Queensland. The team is a member of the Australian Ice Hockey League (AIHL). The team was founded in 2022 as an expansion AIHL team and are the first team based in Queensland since the Blue Tongues last competed in 2012. The Lightning's home venue is Iceworld Boondall and the team will formally enter the AIHL regular season in 2023.

History

Establishment
The Brisbane Lightning was founded on 13 February 2022. The Lightning was born out of a joint venture between Ice Hockey Queensland (IHQ) and the Brisbane Buccaneers and Southern Stars, following IHQ pulling support from the Brisbane Rampage. The joint venture's goal was to establish a top-level ice hockey team in Brisbane and obtain an Australian Ice Hockey League (AIHL) licence. On 28 February 2022, the Lightning secured an AIHL licence, and would enter the league in the 2023 season. In 2022, Brisbane would setup the organisation, hire back and front office staff, form a playing roster and play a number of exhibition games against AIHL teams. 

After securing their AIHL licence in February 2022, Brisbane announced the appointment of their inaugural head coach on 9 March 2022. Terry Kiliwnik was named along with his assistant coach Ivan Rapchuk. Kiliwnik joined the new team with a wealth of junior coaching experience with Queensland and had most recently been the head coach of the Brisbane Goannas in the Australian Women's Ice Hockey League (AWIHL). Rapchuk also joined with a wealth of Queensland junior hockey coaching experience. The following day the yet unnamed team officially launched their new name, Brisbane Lightning and confirmed exhibition matches would be held in 2022 with AIHL opposition. On 14 March 2022, the team unveiled its logo and colours that had been designed by P27 Motion Design. The logo features the team name Brisbane Lightning and a stylised Story Bridge in front of a background of the Brisbane CBD and a bolt of lightning. The teams colours would be black, grey and white, similar to the LA Kings. In April 2022, the Lightning announced their maiden playing roster. The roster included two players, Damian Bright and Thomas Kiliwnik, moving from rival AIHL teams, Melbourne Mustangs and Newcastle Northstars respectively. Five players named had already been announced for the Rampage for 2022 and Matthew Johnson was the only selected player to have played for the previous AIHL Queensland team Gold Coast Blue Tongues. On 9 April 2022, the AIHL released its updated season schedule and the Lightning confirmed it would participate in 15 exhibition games in 2022. Beginning late April and running through to late August, Brisbane would face-off home and away against six teams, including: Northstars, Ice Dogs, Bears, Mustangs, Rhinos and Brave.

The Lightning announced its inaugural on-ice leadership team on 23 April 2022. Experienced AIHL defenceman, Damian Bright, was named lightning's first captain with Dylan Kendrick and Eric Speedie will serving as alternate captains.

Exhibition season (2022)
Boondall was the setting for the Lightning's first ever game on 23 April 2022. Brisbane played the visiting Melbourne Mustangs in front of a sell out crowd. The home team controlled the game and led at every interval. In the first period the Lightning finished 3-0 ahead. Eric Speedie scored the first ever Brisbane Lightning goal. In the second period Brisbane added to their tally with another goal to lead 4-0. The third period proved a closer encounter with the Mustangs registering a goal but the Lightning did not let up and posted two goals themselves to win the game 6-1. 

On 24 July 2022, the exhibition game between the Brisbane Lightning and Sydney Bears held at Iceworld Boondall in Brisbane was abandoned near the end of the second period following an ugly high sticking incident. Subsequently, the AIHL Player Safety Committee conducted an investigation into the incident. The committee concluded its investigation on 6 August 2022 and announced its ruling. It decided to suspend the Brisbane Lightning player involved for seven AIHL games. It also suspended the player from all Ice Hockey Australia national events until the penalty is served in 2023. Additionally, the Sydney Bears organistion was fined $3,500 for intentionally forfeiting the game.

Brisbane ended up playing 14 exhibition games in total in 2022, one short of the originally planned 15, after the game in late August verse the CBR Brave was cancelled. The Lightning's exhibition record in 2022 saw the Brisbane team win seven games, lose six games and lose a further two games in overtime. Following the conclusion of the exhibition season, the Lightning awarded Eamon McKay with the coaches award and Steve Harris as the players player award.

Admission to the AIHL and AWIHL
On 9 September 2022, the AIHL announced that the Brisbane Lightning had been successful in obtaining a full AIHL licence and would join the league for season 2023. Following this announcement, the Lightning organisation secured an agreement with the Australian Women's Ice Hockey League (AWIHL) team Brisbane Goannas in early October 2022 to acquire the founding AWIHL team and re-brand them as the Lightning.

Season-by-season results

1 Exhibition record: 14 games, 7 wins, 7 losses (2 in overtime), 81 goals scored, 65 goals conceded. 2 additional games were cancelled in the final week of August 2022 and 1 game was abandoned mid-game.

Players

Current roster
Team roster for the 2022 AIHL season

Team staff
Current as of 2022 AIHL season.

Leaders

Team captains
The Lightning have had a total of one captain in the team's history.

References:

Head coaches
Brisbane have had a total of one head coach in the team's history.

References:

General managers
The Lightning have had two general managers in the team's history.

References:

Broadcasting
Current:
 Kayo Sports (2023 - present) – Domestic online video broadcasting in Australia as part of the league wide deal struck in the lead up to the 2022 AIHL season to show every AIHL game live.
 Sportradar (2023 - present) – International online video broadcasting in North America and Europe as part of a league-wide 3-year deal signed in March 2022 in the lead up to the 2022 AIHL season.

References

External links

 AIHL official website
 Brisbane Lightning Official Facebook
 Brisbane Lightning News
 IceWorld Boondall official website

Australian Ice Hockey League teams
Ice hockey teams in Australia
Sporting clubs in Brisbane
2022 establishments in Australia
Ice hockey clubs established in 2022